Bisoha is a village situated on an approach road at a distance 1.5 km from Lookhi village on Kanina-Kosli road in Rewari district.

Geography 

See also
 Villages of Rewari District

References

See also
 Karoli, India
 Yaduvanshi Ahirs
 Lookhi
 Kosli
 Kanina khas
 Rewari
 Mahendragarh
 Yadav caste

Villages in Rewari district